John Tyler Haight (October 15, 1841 – December 3, 1892) was an American Democratic Party politician from New Jersey, who served on the Colts Neck Township Committee, the Monmouth County, New Jersey Board of Chosen Freeholders and as Monmouth County Clerk.

He was born in Colts Neck and was a resident there his entire life, with the exception of that time spent as a student at Princeton University.

Haight was elected in 1868 to the Board of Chosen Freeholders representing Atlantic Township. At the May, 1875 annual reorganization, he was chosen as Director of the Monmouth County, New Jersey Board of Chosen Freeholders, and served as Director through May 1881, when he left the board.

He served in the New Jersey State Assembly in 1871 and 1872.

In 1890, Haight was the successful Democratic candidate for county clerk, defeating Democratic incumbent C. Ewing Patterson, who was running as an independent, and John Hubbard, the Republican.

John T. Haight died of pneumonia on December 3, 1892. A brother, Charles Haight, served in the United States House of Representatives, and a son, Thomas Griffith Haight, served as a judge on the Third Circuit Court of Appeals.

See also
List of Monmouth County Freeholder Directors

Notes and references

1841 births
1892 deaths
Deaths from pneumonia in New Jersey
County commissioners in New Jersey
Democratic Party members of the New Jersey General Assembly
People from Colts Neck Township, New Jersey
Politicians from Monmouth County, New Jersey
Princeton University alumni
19th-century American politicians